The 2003 Campeonato Mineiro de Futebol do Módulo I was the 89th season of Minas Gerais's top-flight professional football league. The season began on January 26 and ended on March 30. Cruzeiro won the title for the 32nd time.

Participating teams

League table

References 

Campeonato Mineiro seasons
Mineiro